Davyd Harries (born 31 January 1937) is a Welsh actor. His memorable roles are as Sgt. Ken Ridgeway in 39 episodes of Hunter's Walk, Stiva in the 1977 BBC adaptation of Anna Karenina, Charlie in S.W.A.L.K., Thomas the Apostle in 1985 minseries A.D. and D.I. Spalding in soap opera Emmerdale (1998–1999).

Career

After graduating from RADA in 1958, Harries began his career in the theatre. In 1965, he became a member of the Royal Shakespeare Company followed by performing at the Northcott Theatre in 1967.

Entering the TV and film industry in 1967 (despite an appearance in Stranger in the City in 1962), his work has included Softly, Softly, Out of the Unknown, Department S, Thirty-Minute Theatre, Special Branch, The Liver Birds, Budgie, Owen, M.D., Man at the Top, The Rivals of Sherlock Holmes, Arthur of the Britons, Churchill's People, Target, Doctor Who’s The Armageddon Factor, Play for Today, Tales of the Unexpected, Secret Army, Blake's 7, The Gentle Touch, Minder, Strangers, Angels, In Loving Memory, Bergerac, Hannay, The Bill, Casualty, Cadfael, The Chief, Dalziel and Pascoe, Bugs, Coronation Street, Night and Day, Prime Suspect 6, Hollyoaks, Murphy's Law, Hex and The Queen.

In film, he appeared in Under Milk Wood, Overlord and Beautiful Thing.

On stage, Harries has appeared in many productions for Hornchurch Repertory Company and Bristol Old Vic, as well as joining Derek Nimmo's British Airways Theatre, touring the world to places such and the Middle and Far East, appearing in Bedroom Farce and the two-handed Plaza Suite, alongside Marcia Warren.

Personal life

He is currently married to writer Pam Valentine, whose credits include the sitcom You're Only Young Twice (of which he guest featured in one episode).

References

External links
 
 Davyd Harries at Theatricalia

1937 births
Living people
Welsh male television actors
Welsh male actors
Royal Shakespeare Company members
Alumni of RADA
Welsh male Shakespearean actors
Welsh male stage actors